Brown eyes are organs of vision, each with a brown-pigmented iris surrounding its pupil.

Brown eyes may also refer to:

 Brown Eyes (band), a South Korean musical duo
 Bright-line brown-eye, European moths
 Chylismia claviformis, a species of wildflower known as browneyes

Music
 Brown Eyes (band), Korean boy band

Songs
 "Brown Eyes" (song), a song by Fleetwood Mac
"Brown Eyes (Why Are You Blue?)" Alfred Bryan & George W. Meyer 1925
"Brown Eyes" from The Wild Rose 1926 Otto Harbach, lyrics by Oscar Hammerstein
"Brown Eyes", song by Albert Lee from Some Hearts
 "Brown Eyes", a song by BLACKstreet from Level II
 "Brown Eyes", a song by Destiny's Child from Survivor, lead singer Beyoncé Knowles
 "Brown Eyes", a song by Lady Gaga from The Fame
 "Brown Eyes", a song by The Partridge Family from Sound Magazine
 "Brown Eyes", a song by Rachael Yamagata from Elephants...Teeth Sinking into Heart
 "Brown Eyes", a song by Red House Painters from Red House Painters
 "Brown Eyes", a song by Sarah Brightman from As I Came of Age 1990
 "Brown Eyes", a song by Cecil Surratt And Smitty Smith	1959
 "Brown Eyes", a song by Chris Andrews (singer) 1970
 "Brown Eyes", a song by Jimmy Cliff 1985
 "Brown Eyes", a song by The Saints (Jamaican band) With Baba Brooks' Recording Band   1966
 "Brown Eyes", a song by Sylvia McNeill	  MAM  UK	1974
A Pair Of Brown Eyes, a song by The Pogues 1985
Beautiful Brown Eyes, song by Ethel Smith  1951
Brown Eyed Girl, song by Van Morrison  1967
Don't It Make My Brown Eyes Blue lyrics by Richard Leigh